Saint Nath Í, or Crumnathy, (fl. 6th century) was an early Irish saint who was remembered as the founder of Achonry.

He is said to have been born in the barony of Leyney, in present-day Co. Sligo. In the 17th century, John Colgan compiled a Latin Life of St Cormac, published in the Acta Sanctorum Hiberniae series, which relates that Cormac left his native Munster for Connacht and arrived in the area of Leyney. When Niall, the brother of the local chieftain Diarmait, begged the saint for a blessing, Cormac revealed that he was to have a son by the name of Conamel, whose descendants would include a number of illustrious saints, such as Náth Í "the priest". In the Martyrology of Donegal (9 August), he is described as the priest (cruimthir) Nath Í of Achad Cain Conairi.

He is said to have studied under St Finnián of Clonard. On the instructions of his mentor, he founded a monastery in Achad Cain or Achad Conaire (Achonry)  in the district of the Luigne, the land having been granted to him by Cennfáelad, king of Luigne. The foundation gave its name to what in the 12th century would become the diocese of Achonry. The saint Féchín of Fore is said to have studied under him.

The Book of Lismore (fo. 43v) contains a short Irish anecdote relating what happened when Nath Í, called Dathi the Priest, was once visited by the saints Columba, Comgall and Cainnech after the monastic community had finished their meals.

He was buried in Achad Cain and his festival is 9 August. He is the patron saint of the Irish diocese of Achonry whose cathedral is The Cathedral Church of the Annunciation of the Blessed Virgin Mary and St. Nathy.

Notes

Primary sources
Félire Óengusso
Lives of St Féchín of Fore
Lives of St Finnian of Clonard
Irish Life, ed. Whitley Stokes, Lives of the Saints from the Book of Lismore. Oxford, 1890. Vol. 2. 
Latin Life in the Codex Salmanticensis (fols. 83r-86v), ed. J. De Smedt and C. De Backer, Acta Sanctorum Hiberniae ex codice Salmanticensi. Edinburgh et al., 1888. Cols 189–210.
Latin Life in Bodleian, MS. Rawlinson B. 485 (fols. 54–8), and MS. Rawlinson B. 505 (fols. 156v-160v). Unpublished. 
John Colgan, Vita S. Corbmaci, abbatis ("Life of St Cormac, abbot"), Acta Sanctorum Hiberniae. Louvain, 1645. 26 March.
Life of St Attracht

Christian saints in unknown century
Canonizations by Pope Leo XIII
Medieval saints of Connacht
Clergy from County Sligo
6th-century Irish abbots
Year of birth unknown